Mista Don't Play 2 Everythangs Money is the eighth studio album by American rapper Project Pat from Memphis, Tennessee. It was released on April 14, 2015 via Entertainment One Music. It served as a sequel to his sophomore full-length Mista Don't Play: Everythangs Workin, released in 2001. Production was handled primarily by Pat's younger brother Juicy J, alone with Lil Awree, Joe Simpson, Crazy Mike, J Dizzle on the Beat, Mike Will Made It, K.E. on the Track and Deezy. It features guest appearances from Bankroll Fresh, Doe B, Nasty Mane, Ty Dolla $ign, Wale, Wiz Khalifa and Juicy J. The album peaked at No. 43 on the Top R&B/Hip-Hop Albums chart in the United States, spawning a single "Twerk It".

Track listing

Chart history

References

External links

2015 albums
Project Pat albums
E1 Music albums
Albums produced by Juicy J
Sequel albums
Albums produced by Mike Will Made It